Kishore Sarja (died 27 June 2009) was an Indian film director who worked in Kannada-language films.

Career 
Kishore Sarja started his career as an assistant director before making his directorial debut with Alimayya (1993) starring his brother Arjun Sarja, which was a remake of the 1987 Tamil film Kalyana Kacheri starring Arjun. He is known for directing the film Thutta Mutta (1998) starring Ramesh Aravind, which was commercially successful and his only film that was not a remake. He also directed other films including Jodi (2001) and Baava Baamaida (2001), both starring Shiva Rajkumar. He introduced his nephew, Chiranjeevi Sarja with the film Vayuputra (2009), which was produced by Arjun Sarja.

Personal life 
Sarja's father, Shakti Prasad, was an actor in Kannada cinema while his brother Arjun Sarja is a filmmaker and actor. Kishore died on 26 June 2009.

Filmography 
Director
Alimayya (1993)
Thutta Mutta (1998)
Jodi (2001)
Baava Baamaida (2001)
Vayuputra (2009)
Producer
Padicha Pulla (1989)

References

External links 
 

2009 deaths
Indian film directors
Kannada film directors
21st-century Indian film directors